Incognito is the eighth French-language studio album by Canadian singer Celine Dion, which was her first album on a major label released by CBS Records on 2 April 1987 in Quebec, Canada. It features eight songs produced by Jean Roussel, Aldo Nova and Pierre Bazinet. Six songs were released as singles and all of them reached the top five on the Quebec Airplay Chart, including four number ones: "Incognito", "Lolita (trop jeune pour aimer)", "Comme un cœur froid" and "D'abord, c'est quoi l'amour". Incognito was certified two-times Platinum in Canada and has sold over 500,000 copies worldwide. It topped the chart in Quebec for five weeks.

Background and development
Incognito started Dion's new look, new sound, new team of writers and producers and was issued by the new record company, CBS Records. The album was released in Quebec, Canada in April 1987 and included songs produced by Jean Roussel, Aldo Nova and Pierre Bazinet. Lyrics were written by Luc Plamondon, Isa Minoke and Eddy Marnay, and music was composed by Jean-Alain Roussel, Aldo Nova, Daniel Lavoie, Robert Lafond and Steven Tracey. The album also contains a French-language cover of E. G. Daily's "Love in the Shadows", titled "Délivre-moi".

At the end of 1988, Incognito with different track listing was released in France. Instead of "Partout je te vois" and "Délivre-moi", it included the 1988 Eurovision-winning song, "Ne partez pas sans moi" and Jean-Pierre Ferland-written "Ma chambre" (B-side of Incognito'''s singles). In October 1992, Incognito was issued in France with the original track listing and in August 1995 the album became available in various countries around the world.

Singles
The first single, "On traverse un miroir" entered the Quebec Airplay Chart on 25 April 1987 and peaked at number two. The second single, "Incognito" debuted on this chart on 6 June 1987 and topped it for six weeks. The next single, "Lolita (trop jeune pour aimer)" entered the Quebec Airplay Chart on 3 October 1987 and occupied the number-one position for two weeks.

The fourth single, "Comme un cœur froid" debuted on the chart on 6 February 1988 and also topped it for two weeks. The fifth single, "Délivre-moi" entered the Quebec Airplay Chart on 18 June 1988 and peaked at number four. The last Canadian single, "D'abord, c'est quoi l'amour" debuted on the chart in Quebec on 17 October 1988 and became Dion's fourth number one from Incognito spending two weeks at the top. "Jours de fièvre" was released as a single in Denmark in late 1988.

Promotion
On 2 April 1987, Dion performed at a special show organized to celebrate the release of Incognito at Club L'Esprit in Montreal, Canada. On 7 April 1987, she appeared on the television show Montréal en direct aired on Télé-Metropole and sang "On traverse un miroir", "Lolita (trop jeune pour aimer)" and "Incognito". On 27 September 1987, a television special titled Spécial Incognito aired on Radio-Canada. It included the music video for "Incognito" and performances of songs from Incognito ("Partout je te vois", "Lolita (trop jeune pour aimer)", "Délivre-moi", "On traverse un miroir", "Jours de fièvre", "Comme un cœur froid") and three covers ("My Heart Belongs to Daddy", "Chattanooga Choo Choo" and "Seulement qu'une aventure"). On 2 November 1987, Dion performed the English-language version of "Partout je te vois", "Have a Heart" at the Juno Awards. During 1987, she also performed "Incognito" and "On traverse un miroir" on Ad lib on TVA, "Ma chambre" (B-side of Incognito's singles) on Ferland/Nadeau on Télé-Metropole, "Partout je te vois", "The Greatest Love of All" and "Encore et encore" (duet with Francis Cabrel) on Station soleil on Radio-Québec and "Comme un cœur froid" on Montréal en direct.

On 15 February 1988, Dion sang "Incognito", "Comme un cœur froid" and "Memory" on Téléfun on TQS. On 1 July 1988, she performed "Comme un cœur froid" and "Can't We Try" (duet with Dan Hill) on Joyeux millions Canada on TVA. In September 1988, Dion sang "D'abord, c'est quoi l'amour" on Laser 33-45 on Radio-Canada. Other 1988 television performances included "Ma chambre", "Summertime" and "D'abord, c'est quoi l'amour" on Ad lib. Later, in 1989 Dion also performed "Lolita (trop jeune pour aimer)" and "D'amour ou d'amitié" on Ad lib and "Délivre-moi" on Ferland/Nadeau. In addition, she embarked on the Incognito tournée and gave seventy-five performances in Quebec between January and December 1988.

Critical reception
AllMusic gave the album three out of five stars.

Commercial performance
On 23 November 1987, Incognito was certified Gold by the CRIA for selling 50,000 copies. On 16 September 1988, it was certified Platinum in Canada for selling 100,000 units. Later, on 31 January 1996 the album was certified two-times Platinum by the CRIA for sales of over 200,000 copies. It entered the Quebec chart in April 1987 and topped it for five weeks, spending 91 weeks on it. In Belgium Wallonia, Incognito entered the Ultratop 200 Albums chart in 1995, thanks to the success of D'eux and peaked at number sixty-five on 11 November 1995. Incognito has sold over 500,000 copies worldwide.

Accolades

In 1987, Dion was nominated for the Félix Award for Female Vocalist of the Year and Incognito was nominated in category Pop Album of the Year. Jean Roussel won Félix Award for arranging "Comme un cœur froid" and was nominated for two other Félix Awards for producing and engineering "Incognito". In 1988, Dion won Félix Award for Female Vocalist of the Year and "Incognito" won in category Most Popular Song of the Year. Thanks to the Incognito tournée, Dion also won Félix Award for Best Stage Performance of the Year and was nominated in category Show of the Year. Incognito tournée also won Félix Award for Stage Director of the Year and was nominated in category Stage Designer of the Year and Lighting Designer of the Year.

Dion was also nominated for the Juno Award for Most Promising Female Vocalist of the Year in 1987 and Female Vocalist of the Year in 1989. She was also nominated for three MetroStar Awards in 1987 (Female Vocalist of the Year, Young Artist of the Year, Female Personality of the Year) and four in 1988 (Female Vocalist of the Year, Young Artist of the Year, Female Personality of the Year, Jury Award), and won MetroStar Award for Young Artist of the Year in 1988. Dion's television special titled Spécial Incognito'' was nominated for six Gémeaux Awards in 1988 and won two for Best Cinematography and Best Lighting. Other nominations included Best Direction, Best Production Design, Best Costume Design and Best Makeup/Hair.

Track listing

Personnel
Adapted from AllMusic.

Celine Dion – lead and background vocals
Jean Roussel – producer, arranger, sound recording, drums, bass synth, keyboards
Aldo Nova – producer, arranger, sound recording, mix, programming, guitars, synth bass, drums, keyboards
Pierre Bazinet – producer, arranger, mix, drums
René Angélil – executive producer, impresario
Vito Luprano – executive producer
Ray Fabi – synthesizers, keyboards programming, Macintosh Plus programming
Michel Corriveau – synthesizers, keyboards programming
Denis Chartrand – keyboards
Alain Simard – programming
Daniel Barkbe – synclavier
Bill Beaudoin – guitars, keyboards
Robert Marchand – guitars
Sylvian Bolduc – bass guitar
Alain Barletano – drums
Pierre Hebert – drums
Martin Daviault – saxophone, flute
Patrick Vetter – saxophone
Isa Minoke – background vocals 
Laurie Niedzielski – background vocals 
Paul Northfield – drums recording
Alain Deroque – mastering
J.C. Beaudoin – sound recording, mix
Robin Black – mix
Claude Allard – engineer's assistant
Robert Matichak – engineer's assistant
Martin Soldat – design 
Paul Bella – photos
J.P. Karsenty – photo
Carol – hair 
Suzane Mia Dumont – press agent

Charts

Certifications and sales

Release history

References

External links

1987 albums
Albums produced by Aldo Nova
Albums produced by Pierre Bazinet
Celine Dion albums
Columbia Records albums